Jong-ok is a Korean unisex given name. Its meaning differs based on the hanja used to write each syllable of the name. There are 19 hanja with the reading "jong" and five hanja with the reading "ok" on the South Korean government's official list of hanja which may be registered for use in given names.

People with this name include:
Ri Jong-ok (1916–1999), premier of North Korea from 1977 to 1984
Choi Jong-ok (born 1945), South Korean volleyball player
Bae Jong-ok (born 1964), South Korean actress

See also
List of Korean given names

References

Korean unisex given names